The secretary of state for constitutional affairs was a secretary of state in the Government of the United Kingdom, with overall responsibility for the business of the Department for Constitutional Affairs. The position existed from 2003 to 2007.

At its creation, certain functions of the lord chancellor which related to the Lord Chancellor's Department were transferred to the new secretary of state. At a later date further functions were also transferred to the secretary of state for constitutional affairs from the first secretary of state, a position within the government held by the deputy prime minister.

The only holder of the post was Lord Falconer who also simultaneously continued to serve as Lord Chancellor. Certain functions, linked by statute with the office of Lord Chancellor, were not transferred to the new office of secretary of state for constitutional affairs.

The corresponding shadow minister was the shadow secretary of state for constitutional affairs, and the secretary of state was also scrutinised by the Constitutional Affairs Committee.

The post was formally created through the approval, by way of the Order-in-Council procedure, of the Secretary of State for Constitutional Affairs Order 2003 (SI 2003 No. 1887). The office was discontinued on 9 May 2007, and all of its responsibilities were transferred to the new post of secretary of state for justice, the first holder of which was also Lord Falconer.

Secretary of State for Constitutional Affairs

See also
 Constitutional Reform Act 2005

External links 
Text of the Secretary of State for Constitutional Affairs Order 2003

References

Constitutional Affairs

Defunct ministerial offices in the United Kingdom
2003 establishments in the United Kingdom
2007 disestablishments in the United Kingdom